Professor Charles Mark Lwanga Olweny, MBChB, MMed, MD, FRACP, is a Ugandan physician, oncologist, academic and medical researcher. Currently he is a professor of medicine and Immediate past vice-chancellor at Uganda Martyrs University, based at Nkozi, Mpigi District, in Central Uganda.

Background
He was born in 1940, in Tororo, Tororo District, in Eastern Uganda.

Education
Professor Olweny attended St. Peter's College Tororo, for his O-Level education (S1-S4). He attended St. Mary's College Kisubi for his A-Level classes (S5-S6). In 1961, Olweny entered Makerere University School of Medicine, the oldest medical school in Uganda and East Africa, which was founded in 1924., graduating with the degree of Bachelor of Medicine and Bachelor of Surgery (MBChB), in 1966. Later, he obtained the degree of Master of Medicine in Internal Medicine (MMed). He followed that with the degree of Doctor of Medicine (MD), all from Makerere University. Olweny's chosen speciality is medical oncology.

Career
Charles Olweny served as the director of the Uganda Cancer Institute, from 1972 until 1982. Under his stewardship, the team of Ugandan medical researchers that he led were the first group to demonstrate that liver cancer could be successfully treated with chemotherapy using the drug doxorubicin, which is still the mainstay of treatment for liver cancer today. They were also able to confirm that Burkitt lymphoma could be cured with a high dose of chemotherapy and showed that the same was true for childhood Hodgkin disease. They documented the incidence of endemic Kaposi sarcoma in children and conducted clinical trials on how to treat it.

During the same timeframe, Olweny served – first as a lecturer, then senior lecturer and later as professor of Medicine – in the Faculty of Internal Medicine, at Makerere University School of Medicine, serving as head of department, from 1979 until 1982. While in Australia, during the 1980s, he served as clinical professor at the Department of Medicine & Surgery, University of Adelaide, Adelaide, South Australia. He also served as senior director for Medical Oncology, Cancer Control Programme, Royal Adelaide Hospital.

In the 1990s, Dr. Olweny migrated to Winnipeg, Manitoba, Canada, to take up appointment as medical oncologist at St. Boniface General Hospital, in Winnipeg. He also served as coordinator, Section of Hematology & Oncology at CancerCare Manitoba, and as an associate staff at the Health Sciences Centre in Winnipeg. He was appointed to his present position in 2006 and assumed office in September of that year. Professor Charles Olweny has written over 20 books and over 120 professional articles. On 1 January 2015, Professor Olweny retired as the Vice Chancellor of Uganda Martyrs University, handing over to Prof. Dr. John Chrysostom Maviiri, formerly Vice Chancellor of the Catholic University of Eastern Africa in Nairobi.

Personal details
Professor Charles Olweny is married, with five adult children.

See also

References

External links
 A Rolling Stone: An Autobiography of Professor Olweny
  About Charles Mark Lwanga Olweny
 Homepage of Uganda Martyrs University
 Narrative of Circumstances Leading To Forced Exile
 Brief Biography of Professor Charles Olweny
 Highlights of Lecture By Professor Olweny In 2009

Living people
Makerere University alumni
Academic staff of Makerere University
Academic staff of Uganda Martyrs University
People from Tororo District
People from Eastern Region, Uganda
1944 births
Ugandan Roman Catholics
Ugandan oncologists
People educated at St. Mary's College Kisubi
Fellows of the Royal Australasian College of Physicians